Stefan Nedelchev (Bulgarian: Стефан Неделчев; born 9 May 1996) is a Bulgarian footballer who plays as a winger for Lokomotiv GO.

Career

Early career
Nedelchev started his career in the local team of Pavlikeni at age of seven. In 2010 he moved to Litex Lovech Academy. In the summer of 2015 he joined the summer camp of  Neftochimic Burgas and signed a contract. He made his debut for the team on 25 July 2015 in match against Lokomotiv 2012 Mezdra.

Etar Veliko Tarnovo
In July 2016 Nedelchev moved to the newly promoted to Bulgarian Second League team of Etar Veliko Tarnovo. He made his debut for the team in the league on 13 August 2016 in match against Levski Karlovo. He scored his debut goal for the club on 17 September 2016 in match against Pomorie. The team won the league and promoted to First Professional Football League in the end of the season.

Nedelchev completed his professional debut on 14 July 2017 in the debut league match of the team against Lokomotiv Plovdiv.

On 16 August 2017, Nedelchev was loaned to Botev Galabovo until the end of the season.

International career

Youth levels
Nedelchev was called up for the Bulgaria U21 team on 14 March 2017.

Career statistics

Club

References

External links
 

1996 births
Living people
People from Pavlikeni
Bulgarian footballers
Bulgaria under-21 international footballers
Association football wingers
Neftochimic Burgas players
SFC Etar Veliko Tarnovo players
FC Botev Galabovo players
PFC Litex Lovech players
FC Lokomotiv Gorna Oryahovitsa players
First Professional Football League (Bulgaria) players
Sportspeople from Veliko Tarnovo Province